The  singles Tournament at the 2004 Gaz de France Stars took place in late September to early October, 2004, on indoor hard courts in Hasselt, Belgium.

Elena Dementieva won the title with a bizarre scoreline in the final, becoming the first winner of this tournament in an all-Russian final.

Seeds
The top two seeds get a bye into round two.

Draw

Finals

Top half

Bottom half

References

2004 Singles
2004 WTA Tour
2004 in Belgian tennis
Sport in Hasselt